Xi Octantis, Latinized from ξ Octantis, is a solitary variable star in the southern circumpolar constellation Octans. It has an apparent magnitude of about 5.3, allowing it to be faintly seen with the naked eye; however, this varies slightly.

Xi Octantis has a stellar classification of B6 V, indicating that it is an ordinary B-type main-sequence star. Hintler et al. gives it a luminosity class IV (subgiant) while Houk and Cowley gives a classification intermediate between a B5 and B7 dwarf. Nevertheless, it has 4 times the mass of the Sun and is 3 times larger.

When the Hipparcos catalogue was released in 1997, Xi Octantis was found to vary in magnitude — ranging from 5.32 to 5.36 based on data from the International Variable Star Index. It has since been classified as a Slowly pulsating B-dwarf with a period of 1.78 days.

References

Octans
B-type main-sequence stars
B-type subgiants
Octantis, Xi
Octantis, 77
Slowly pulsating B stars
215573
112781
8663
CD-80 828
Variable stars